Ali Talal Daher (born 26 November 1996) is a Lebanese footballer who plays as a goalkeeper for  club Shabab Sahel, on loan from Ahed.

Club career 
Starting his career at Ahed, Daher was sent on a two-year loan to Shabab Sahel. He played 18 matches for the club in all competitions, nine in the league, keeping eight clean sheets. Daher was recalled from loan on 25 January 2020 to participate in the 2020 AFC Cup. In July 2020, Daher's loan to Shabab Sahel was renewed for the 2020–21 and 2021–22 seasons; in July 2022, the loan was further renewed for the 2022–23 season.

International career 
Daher made his international debut for Lebanon on 10 September 2019, in a friendly game against Oman.

Career statistics

International

Honours 
Ahed
 Lebanese Premier League: 2016–17

Shabab Sahel
 Lebanese Elite Cup: 2019

References

External links 

 
 
 

1996 births
Living people
People from Nabatieh District
Association football goalkeepers
Lebanese footballers
Lebanon international footballers
Lebanese Premier League players
Al Ahed FC players
Shabab Al Sahel FC players